is a private university in Nishihara, Okinawa, Japan, established in 2004. Its parent body is the Okinawa Christian Institute.

References

External links
 Official website

Educational institutions established in 2004
Christian universities and colleges in Japan
Private universities and colleges in Japan
Universities and colleges in Okinawa Prefecture
2004 establishments in Japan